This is a list of diseases starting with the letter "S".

Sa

Saa–Sal
 Saal Bulas syndrome
 Saal Greenstein syndrome
 Sabinas brittle hair syndrome
 Saccharopinuria
 Sackey–Sakati–Aur syndrome
 Sacral agenesis
 Sacral defect anterior sacral meningocele
 Sacral hemangiomas multiple congenital abnormalities
 Sacral meningocele conotruncal heart defects
 Sacral plexopathy
 Sacrococcygeal dysgenesis association
 Sadistic personality disorder
 Saethre–Chotzen syndrome
 Saito-Kuba-Tsuruta syndrome
 Sakati syndrome
 Salcedo syndrome
 Salivary disorder
 Salivary gland disorders
 Salla disease
 Sallis–Beighton syndrome
 Salmonellosis (Salmonella infections)
 Salti–Salem syndrome
 Salice Disease

Sam–Say
 Sammartino–Decreccio syndrome
 Samson–Gardner syndrome
 Samson–Viljoen syndrome
 Sanderson–Fraser syndrome
 Sandhaus–Ben Ami syndrome
 Sandhoff disease
 Sandrow–Sullivan–Steel syndrome
 Sanfilippo syndrome
 Santavuori disease
 Santos–Mateus–Leal syndrome
 SAPHO syndrome
 Sarcoidosis, pulmonary
 Sarcoidosis
 Sarcoma, granulocytic
 Sarcosinemia
 Satoyoshi syndrome
 Savisky syndrome
 Saul–Wilkes–Stevenson syndrome
 Say–Barber–Hobbs syndrome
 Say–Barber–Miller syndrome
 Say–Carpenter–syndrome
 Say–Field–Coldwell syndrome
 Say–Meyer syndrome

Sc

Sca
 Scabies
 Scab Face
 SCAD deficiency
 Scalp defects postaxial polydactyly
 Scalp–ear–nipple syndrome
 Scapuloiliac dysostosis
 Scapuloperoneal myopathy
 SCARF syndrome
 Scarlet fever

Sch

Scha–Schm
 Schaap–Taylor–Baraitser syndrome
 Schaefer–Stein–Oshman syndrome
 Schamberg's disease pigmentation disorder
 Schamberg's disease
 Scheie syndrome
 Schereshevskij Turner
 Scheuermann's disease
 Schimke syndrome
 Schindler disease
 Schinzel–Giedion syndrome
 Schinzel syndrome
 Schinzel–Giedion midface retraction syndrome
 Schisis association
 Schistosomiasis
 Schizencephaly
 Schizoaffective disorder
 Schizoid personality disorder
 Schizophrenia
 Schizophrenia, genetic types
 Schizophrenia intellectual disability deafness retinitis
 Schizophreniform disorder
 Schizotypal personality disorder
 Schlegelberger–Grote syndrome
 Schmidt syndrome
 Schmitt Gillenwater Kelly syndrome

Schn–Schw
 Schneckenbecken dysplasia
 Schofer–Beetz–Bohl syndrome
 Scholte–Begeer–Van Essen syndrome
 Schraderman's disease
 Schrander–Stumpel–Theunissen–Hulsmans syndrome
 Schroer–Hammer–Mauldin syndrome
 Upshaw–Schülman syndrome
 Schwannoma, malignant
 Schwannomatosis
 Schwartz–Newark syndrome
 Schwartz–Jampel syndrome
 Schwartz–lelek syndrome
 Schweitzer–Kemink–Malcolm syndrome

Sci–Scr
 Sciatica
 Scimitar syndrome
 Scleredema
 Scleroatonic myopathy
 Sclerocornea, syndactyly, ambiguous genitalia
 Scleroderma
 Scleromyxedema
 Sclerosing bone dysplasia mental retardation
 Sclerosing cholangitis
 Sclerosing lymphocytic lobulitis
 Sclerosing mesenteritis
 Sclerosteosis
 Sclerotylosis
 SCOT deficiency
 Scott–Bryant–Graham syndrome
 Scott syndrome
 Scrapie

Scu
 Scurvy

Sco
 Scoliosis
 Scoliosis as part of NF
 Scoliosis with unilateral unsegmented bar
 Scotoma

Se

Sea–Sei
 Sea-blue histiocytosis
 Seafood poisoning
 Seasonal affective disorder
 Seaver Cassidy syndrome
 Sebocystomatosis
 Secernentea Infections
 Seckel like syndrome Majoor–Krakauer type
 Seckel like syndrome type Buebel
 Seckel syndrome 2
 Seckel syndrome
 Secondary pulmonary hypertension
 Seemanova–Lesny syndrome
 Seemanova syndrome type 2
 Seghers syndrome
 Segmental neurofibromatosis
 Segmental vertebral anomalies
 Seizures benign familial neonatal recessive form
 Seizures mental retardation hair dysplasia

Sel–Seq
 Selective mutism
 Selenium poisoning
 Self-defeating personality disorder
 Selig–Benacerraf–Greene syndrome
 Seminoma
 Semmerkrot–Haraldsson–Weenaes syndrome
 Sener syndrome
 Sengers–Hamel–Otten syndrome
 Senior syndrome
 Senior–Løken syndrome
 Sennetsu fever
 Sensenbrenner syndrome
 Sensorineural hearing loss
 Sensory neuropathy type 1
 Sensory processing disorder
 Sensory neuropathy
 Sensory radicular neuropathy recessive form
 Senter syndrome
 Seow–Najjar syndrome
 Separation anxiety disorder
 Sepsis
 Septic shock
 Septooptic dysplasia digital anomalies
 Septo-optic dysplasia
 Sequeiros–Sack syndrome

Ser–Sez
 Seres–Santamaria–Arimany–Muniz syndrome
 Serum sickness
 Serious digitalis intoxication
 Setleis syndrome
 Severe acute respiratory syndrome (SARS)
 Severe combined immunodeficiency (SCID)
 Severe infantile axonal neuropathy
 Sex chromosome disorders
 Sexual aversion disorder
 Sexually transmitted disease
 Sézary syndrome
 Sézary's lymphoma

Sh

Sha–Shi
 Shapiro syndrome
 Shared psychotic disorder
 Sharma–Kapoor–Ramji syndrome
 Sharp syndrome
 Shaver's disease
 Sheehan syndrome
 Shellfish poisoning
Shellfish poisoning, amnesic (ASP)
Shellfish poisoning, diarrheal (DSP)
Shellfish poisoning, neurotoxic (NSP)
Shellfish poisoning, paralytic (PSP)
 Shigellosis
 Shingles
 Shith–Filkins syndrome

Sho

 Shock
 Shokeir syndrome

Shor

Short b – Short r
 Short bowel syndrome
 Short broad great toe macrocranium
 Short-chain acyl-CoA dehydrogenase deficiency
 Short limb dwarf lethal Colavita–Kozlowski type
 Short limb dwarf lethal Mcalister–Crane type
 Short limb dwarf oedema iris coloboma
 Short limb dwarfism Al Gazali type
 Short limbs abnormal face congenital heart disease
 Short limbs subluxed knees cleft palate
 Short QT syndrome
 Short rib syndrome Beemer type
 Short rib-polydactyly syndrome
 Short rib-polydactyly syndrome, Beermer type
 Short rib-polydactyly syndrome, Majewski type
 Short rib-polydactyly syndrome, Saldino-Noonan type
 Short rib-polydactyly syndrome, Verma-Naumoff type
 Short ribs craniosynostosis polysyndactyly

Short s
 Short stature abnormal skin pigmentation mental retardation
 Short stature Brussels type
 Short stature contractures hypotonia
 Short stature cranial hyperostosis hepatomegaly
 Short stature deafness neutrophil dysfunction
 Short stature dysmorphic face pelvic scapula dysplasia
 Short stature heart defect craniofacial anomalies
 Short stature hyperkaliemia acidosis
 Short stature locking fingers
 Short stature mental retardation eye anomalies
 Short stature mental retardation eye defects
 Short stature microcephaly heart defect
 Short stature microcephaly seizures deafness
 Short stature monodactylous ectrodactyly cleft palate
 Short stature prognathism short femoral necks
 Short stature Robin sequence cleft mandible hand anomalies clubfoot
 Short stature talipes natal teeth
 Short stature valvular heart disease
 Short stature webbed neck heart disease
 Short stature wormian bones dextrocardia
 Short syndrome

Short t
 Short tarsus absence of lower eyelashes

Shou
 Shoulder and thorax deformity congenital heart disease
 Shoulder girdle defect mental retardation familial

Shp–Shy
 Shprintzen–Golberg craniosynostosis
 Shprintzen syndrome
 Shwachman syndrome
 Shwachman–Bodian–Diamond syndrome
 Shwartzman phenomenon
 Shy–Drager syndrome

Si

Sia–Sim
 Sialadenitis
 Sialidosis type 1 and 3
 Sialidosis
 Sialuria, French type
 Sickle cell anemia
 Sideroblastic anemia, autosomal
 Siderosis
 Siegler–Brewer–Carey syndrome
 Silengo–Lerone–Pelizzo syndrome
 Silent sinus syndrome
 Silicosiderosis
 Silicosis
 Sillence syndrome
 Silver–Russell syndrome
 Silvery hair syndrome
 Simian B virus infection
 Simosa–Penchaszadeh–Bustos syndrome
 Simpson–Golabi–Behmel syndrome

Sin–Six
 Singh–Chhaparwal–Dhanda syndrome
 Single upper central incisor
 Single ventricular heart
 Singleton Merten syndrome
 Sino-auricular heart block
 Sinus cancer
 Sinus histiocytosis
 Sinus node disease and myopia
 Sipple syndrome
 Sirenomelia
 Sitophobia
 Sitosterolemia
 Situs inversus totalis with cystic dysplasia of kidneys and pancreas
 Situs inversus viscerum-cardiopathy
 Situs inversus, X linked
 Sixth nerve palsy

Sj–Sn
 Sjögren–Larsson syndrome
 Sjögren's syndrome
 Skandaitis
 Skeletal dysplasia brachydactyly
 Skeletal dysplasia epilepsy short stature
 Skeletal dysplasia orofacial anomalies
 Skeletal dysplasia San diego type
 Skeletal dysplasias
 Skeleto cardiac syndrome with thrombocytopenia
 Sketetal dysplasia coarse facies mental retardation
 Skin peeling syndrome
 Slavotinek Hurst syndrome
 Sleepwalking disorder
 Sly syndrome
 Small cell lung cancer
 Small intestinal bacterial overgrowth
 Small intestinal fungal overgrowth
 Small uncloven cell lymphoma
 Smallpox
 Smet–Fabry–Fryns syndrome
 Smith–Fineman–Myers syndrome
 Smith–Lemli-Opitz syndrome
 Smith–Martin–Dodd syndrome
 Smith–Magenis syndrome
 Sneddon's syndrome

So
 Sociophobia
 Soft-tissue sarcoma
 Sohval–Soffer syndrome
 Somatization disorder
 Somatostatinoma
 Sommer–Hines syndrome
 Sommer–Rathbun–Battles syndrome
 Sommer–Young–Wee–Frye syndrome
 Sondheimer syndrome
 Sonoda syndrome
 Sosby syndrome
 Sotos syndrome
 Southwestern Athabaskan genetic diseases

Sp

Spa

Spar
 Sparse hair ptosis mental retardation

Spas

Spasm
 Spasmodic dysphonia
 Spasmodic torticollis

Spast

Spasti
Spastic a – Spastic d
 Spastic angina with healthy coronary artery
 Spastic ataxia Charlevoix–Saguenay type
 Spastic diplegia infantile type
 Spastic dysphonia
Spastic p
 Spastic paraparesis deafness
 Spastic paraparesis, infantile
 Spastic paraparesis
 Spastic paraplegia epilepsy mental retardation
 Spastic paraplegia facial cutaneous lesions
 Spastic paraplegia familial autosomal recessive form
 Spastic paraplegia glaucoma precocious puberty
 Spastic paraplegia mental retardation corpus callosum
 Spastic paraplegia nephritis deafness
 Spastic paraplegia neuropathy poikiloderma
 Spastic paraplegia type 1, X-linked
 Spastic paraplegia type 2, X-linked
 Spastic paraplegia type 3, dominant
 Spastic paraplegia type 4, dominant
 Spastic paraplegia type 5A, recessive
 Spastic paraplegia type 5B, recessive
 Spastic paraplegia type 6, dominant
 Spastic paraplegia, familial
 Spastic paresis glaucoma mental retardation
 Spastic quadriplegia retinitis pigmentosa mental retardation
 Spasticity mental retardation
 Spasticity multiple exostoses
 Spatic paraparesis vitiligo premature graying

Spe–Sph
 Specific phobia
 Spellacy gibbs watts syndrome
 Spermatogenesis arrest
 Spherocytosis
 Spherophakia brachymorphia syndrome
 Sphingolipidosis

Spi

Spie
 Spielmeyer–Vogt disease

Spin

Spina–Spine
 Spina bifida
 Spina bifida hypospadias
 Spinal and bulbar muscular atrophy
 Spinal atrophy ophthalmoplegia pyramidal syndrome
 Spinal cord disorder
 Spinal cord injury
 Spinal cord neoplasm
 Spinal dysostosis type Anhalt
 Spinal muscular atrophy
 Spinal muscular atrophy with congenital bone fractures
 Spinal muscular atrophy with lower extremity predominance 1
 Spinal muscular atrophy with lower extremity predominance 2
 Spinal muscular atrophy with pontocerebellar hypoplasia
 Spinal muscular atrophy with progressive myoclonic epilepsy
 Spinal muscular atrophy with respiratory distress type 1
 Spinal shock
 Spine rigid cardiomyopathy

Spino
 Spinocerebellar ataxia (multiple types)
 Spinocerebellar ataxia amyotrophy deafness
 Spinocerebellar ataxia dysmorphism
 Spinocerebellar atrophy type 3
 Spinocerebellar degeneration corneal dystrophy
 Spinocerebellar degenerescence book type

Spir
 Spirochetes disease
 Spirurida infections

Spl
 Spleen neoplasm
 Splenic agenesis syndrome
 Splenic flexure syndrome
 Splenogonadal fusion limb defects micrognatia
 Splenomegaly
 Split hand deformity mandibulofacial dysostosis
 Split hand split foot malformation autosomal reces
 Split hand split foot mandibular hypoplasia
 Split hand split foot-nystagmus syndrome
 Split hand split foot X linked
 Split hand urinary anomalies spina bifida
 Split-hand deformity

Spo

Spon

Spona
 Sponastrime dysplasia

Spond

Spondy
Spondyla–Spondyli
 Spondylarthritis
 Spondylarthropathies
 Spondylarthropathy
 Spondylitis
Spondylo
 Spondylo camptodactyly syndrome
 Spondylo costal dysostosis dandy walker
 Spondylocarpotarsal synostosis
 Spondylocostal dysplasia dominant
 Spondylodysplasia brachyolmia
 Spondyloenchondrodysplasia
 Spondyloepimetaphyseal dysplasia congenita, Iraqi
 Spondyloepimetaphyseal dysplasia congenita, Strudw
 Spondyloepimetaphyseal dysplasia joint laxity
 Spondyloepimetaphyseal dysplasia
 Spondyloepiphyseal dysplasia nephrotic syndrome
 Spondyloepiphyseal dysplasia tarda progressive art
 Spondyloepiphyseal dysplasia tarda
 Spondyloepiphyseal dysplasia, congenital type
 Spondyloepiphyseal dysplasia
 Spondylohypoplasia arthrogryposis popliteal pteryg
 Spondylometaphyseal dysplasia, 'corner fracture' t
 Spondylometaphyseal dysplasia, Schmidt type
 Spondylometaphyseal dysplasia, Sedaghatian type
 Spondylometaphyseal dysplasia, X-linked
 Spondylometaphyseal dysplasia
 Spondyloperipheral dysplasia short ulna

Spong–Spont
 Spongiform encephalopathy
 Spongy degeneration of central nervous system
 Spontaneous periodic hypothermia
 Spontaneous pneumothorax familial type

Spor–Spot
 Sporotrichosis
 Spotted fever

Spr
 Spranger schinzel yers syndrome
 Sprengel deformity

Sq–Ss
 Squamous cell carcinoma
 SSADH (succinic semialdehyde dehydrogenase deficiency)
 SSPE (subacute sclerosing panencephalitis)

St

 St. Anthony's fire

Sta–Ste
 Stalker chitayat syndrome
 Stampe sorensen syndrome
 Staphylococcal infection
 Staphylococcus aureus infection
 Staphylococcus epidermidis infection
 Staphylococcal scalded skin syndrome
 Stargardt disease
 Steatocystoma multiplex natal teeth
 Steatocystoma multiplex
 Steele–Richardson–Olszewski syndrome, atypical
 Steinfeld syndrome
 Stein–Leventhal syndrome
 Sterility due to immotile flagella
 Stern–Lubinsky–Durrie syndrome
 Sternal cleft
 Sternal cyst vascular anomalies
 Sternal malformation vascular dysplasia association
 Steroid dehydrogenase deficiency dental anomalies
 Stevens–Johnson syndrome

Sti–Sto
 Stickler syndrome
 Stickler syndrome, type 1
 Stickler syndrome, type 2
 Stickler syndrome, type 3
 Stiff person syndrome
 Stiff skin syndrome
 Still's disease
 Stimmler syndrome
 Stimulant psychosis
 Stoelinga–De Koomen–davis syndrome
 Stoll–Alembik–Dott syndrome
 Stoll–Alembik–Finck syndrome
 Stoll–Geraudel–Chauvin syndrome
 Stoll–Kieny–Dott syndrome
 Stoll–Levy–Francfort syndrome
 Stomach cancer, familial
 Stomach cancer
 Stomatitis
 Storage pool platelet disease
 Stormorken–Sjaastad–Langslet syndrome

Str–Stu
 Strabismus
 Stratton–Garcia–Young syndrome
 Stratton–Parker syndrome
 Streeter's dysplasia (Amniotic band syndrome)
 Streptococcus, Group B
 Strep throat
 Striatonigral degeneration infantile
Strømme syndrome
 Strongyloidiasis
 Strudwick syndrome
 Strumpell–Lorrain disease
 Strychnine poisoning
 Stuart factor deficiency, congenital
 Stuccokeratosis
 Sturge–Weber syndrome
 Stuve–Wiedemann dysplasia
 Stye
 Stupidity

Su

Sub–Sum
 Subacute cerebellar degeneration
 Subacute sclerosing leucoencephalitis
 Subacute sclerosing panencephalitis
 Subaortic stenosis short stature syndrome
 Subcortical laminar heterotopia
 Subependymal nodular heterotopia
 Subpulmonary stenosis
 Subvalvular aortic stenosis
 Succinate coenzyme Q reductase deficiency of
 Succinic acidemia lactic acidosis congenital
 Succinic acidemia
 Succinic semialdehyde dehydrogenase deficiency
 Succinyl-CoA acetoacetate transferase deficiency
 Sucrase-isomaltase deficiency
 Sucrose intolerance
 Sudden cardiac death
 Sudden infant death syndrome
 Sudden sniffing death syndrome
 Sugarman syndrome
 Sulfatidosis juvenile, Austin type
 Sulfite and xanthine oxydase deficiency
 Sulfite oxidase deficiency
 Summitt syndrome

Sup–Sut
 Superior mesenteric artery syndrome
 Super mesozoic-dysentery complex
 Supranuclear ocular palsy
 Supraumbilical midabdominal raphe and facial cavernous hemangiomas
 Suriphobia
 Susac syndrome
 Sutherland–Haan syndrome
 Sutton disease II
 Sutton disease II

Sw
 Sweeley–Klionsky disease
 Sweet syndrome
 Swimmer's ear
 Swyer James and McLeod Syndrome
 Swyer syndrome
 Sweatalitus disease
 Swine influenza (H1F1)

Sy

Syb–Sym
 Sybert–Smith syndrome
 Sydenham's chorea
 Symmetrical thalamic calcifications
 Symphalangism brachydactyly craniosynostosis
 Symphalangism brachydactyly
 Symphalangism Cushing type
 Symphalangism distal
 Symphalangism familial proximal
 Symphalangism short stature accessory testis
 Symphalangism with multiple anomalies of hands and feet
 Symphalangism, distal, with microdontia, dental pulp stones, and narrowed zygomatic arch

Syn

Sync–Syng
 Syncamptodactyly scoliosis
 Syncopal paroxysmal tachycardia
 Syncopal tachyarythmia
 Syncope
 Syndactyly
 Syndactyly between 4 and 5
 Syndactyly cataract mental retardation
 Syndactyly–Cenani–Lenz type
 Syndactyly ectodermal dysplasia cleft lip palate hand foot
 Syndactyly type 1 microcephaly mental retardation
 Syndactyly type 2
 Syndactyly type 3
 Syndactyly type 5
 Syndactyly-polydactyly-ear lobe syndrome
 Syndrome of inappropriate antidiuretic hormone
 Syndrome X
 Synechia
 Synesthesia
 Syngnathia cleft palate
 Syngnathia multiple anomalies

Syno–Synp
 Synostosis of talus and calcaneus short stature
 Synovial cancer
 Synovial osteochondromatosis
 Synovial sarcoma
 Synovialosarcoma
 Synovitis acne pustulosis hyperostosis osteitis
 Synovitis granulomatous uveitis cranial neuropathi
 Synovitis
 Synpolydactyly

Syp–Sys
 Syphilis embryopathy
 Syphilis
 Syringobulbia
 Syringocystadenoma papilliferum
 Syringomas
 Syringomas natal teeth oligodontia
 Syringomelia hyperkeratosis
 Syringomyelia
 Systemic arterio-veinous fistula
 Systemic carnitine deficiency
 Systemic lupus erythematosus
 Systemic mastocytosis
 Systemic necrotizing angeitis
 Systemic sclerosis

S